Okenia japonica is a species of sea slug, specifically a dorid nudibranch, a marine gastropod mollusc in the family Goniodorididae.

Distribution
The species was described from Sagami Bay, Japan. It has also been found in Hong Kong.

Description
This Okenia has a flattened body and short lateral papillae on each side of the mantle. It is predominantly opaque white in colour.

Ecology
The species feeds on bryozoans.

References

Goniodorididae
Gastropods described in 1949